Discrimination based on skin color, also known as colorism, or shadeism, is a form of prejudice and discrimination in which people who share similar ethnic traits and people who are perceived as belonging to a darker skinned race are treated differently based on the social implications that come with the cultural meanings that are attached to their darker skin color.

Research has found extensive evidence of discrimination based on skin color in criminal justice, business, the economy, housing, health care, media, and politics in the United States and Europe. Lighter skin tones are seen as preferable in many countries in Africa, Asia and South America.

Worldwide 

Racism affects almost every aspect of people's daily lives. Research shows that people of color are offered fewer opportunities in higher education and employment than white people are offered. Black people are treated more harshly and less politely than white people are treated. As romantic partners, they are considered less desirable and white people are considered more desirable. They also receive compromised medical treatment.

Several meta-analyses find extensive evidence of ethnic and racial discrimination in hiring in the North American and European labor markets. A 2016 meta-analysis of 738 correspondence tests in 43 separate studies done in OECD countries in 1990-2015 finds that there is extensive racial discrimination within both the European and North American hiring process. Equivalent minority candidates need to send around 50% more applications than majority candidates to be invited for an interview. Recent research in the U.S. shows that socioeconomic and health inequality among African Americans along the color-continuum is often similar or even larger in magnitude than what exists between whites and African Americans.

Asia

East Asia, South Asia, Southeast Asia 
 
In East, South and Southeast Asia, a preference for lighter skin is prevalent, especially in countries such as China, South Korea, Taiwan, Hong Kong, Vietnam, India, Pakistan, Bangladesh, Philippines, Indonesia, Thailand and Japan.

The history of skin whitening in East Asia dates back to ancient times. In the ancient dynastic eras, to be light in an area where the sun was harsh implied wealth and nobility because those individuals were able to stay indoors while servants had to labor outside. Ancient Asian cultures also associated light skin with feminine beauty. "Jade" white skin in Korea is known to have been the ideal as far back as the Gojoseon era. Japan's Edo period saw the start of a trend of women whitening their faces with rice powder as a "moral duty". Chinese women valued a "milk white" complexion and swallowed powdered pearls towards that end. Four out of ten women surveyed in Hong Kong, Malaysia, the Philippines, and South Korea reported using a skin whitening cream. In many Asian cultures, colorism is taught to children in the form of fairy tales; just as the Grimms' fairy tales featured light-skinned princesses or maidens, Asian mythological protagonists are typically fair and depict virtue, purity, and goodness. A light complexion is equated with feminine beauty, racial superiority, and power, and continues to have strong influences on marital prospects, employment, status, and income.

Globalized East Asia still retains these biases, but they are compounded by the influence of Westernized beauty ideals and media that equate whiteness with modern and urban wealth and success.

China and Japan 

Hiroshi Wagatsuma writes in Daedalus that Japanese culture has long associated skin color with other physical characteristics that signify degrees of spiritual refinement or degrees of primitiveness.

The scholar repeats an old Japanese proverb: "white skin makes up for seven defects." More specifically for a woman, very light skin allows people to overlook her lack of other desirable physical characteristics. Skin color influenced and continues to influence people's standards of attractiveness, socioeconomic status and capability.

During the Nara period which lasted from 710 to 793 AD, the court ladies of Japan applied a lot of white powder to their faces and added red rosy cheeks. Many references to plump women with white skin appear in drawings and writings from 794 to 1186 AD. In literature, note for example The Tale of Genji (written  1000–1012) by Lady Murasaki.

Malaysia 

A survey concluded that three quarters of Malaysian men thought their partners would be more attractive if they had lighter skin complexions.

In certain Southeast Asian countries such as Malaysia, a common beauty ideal is the "Eurasian look". Locally known as the "pan-Asian look", in Malaysia, it is an ideal that stems from the beauty ideal of fair skin, which Eurasians tend to naturally possess. The overuse of pan-Asian faces on billboards and on television screens has been a controversial issue in the country. The issue was highlighted in 2009 when Zainuddin Maidin, a Malaysian politician, called for the reduction of pan-Asian faces which he claimed dominate TV and billboards and instead increase the number of Malay, Chinese and Indian faces on local television. Despite the controversy surrounding the preference for Malaysians who are of mixed Asian (Malay, Chinese or Indian) and European descent who possess features such as fair skin, some experts in the industry have said that the use of pan-Asian faces can be used to promote the racial diversity of Malaysians. They can also be used to promote a product towards a diverse racial demographic because of their mixed appearance, which the Minister of Information had suggested in 1993.

India

The implications of colorism in India have been apparent since the nation's conception. The legacies of Mughal, Northern and European colonial rule on the Indian subcontinent have influenced modern relations between light skin and power dynamics. Multiple studies have concluded that preference for lighter skin in India is historically linked to both the caste system and Persian, Mughal and European rule. Hinduism's influence also must be considered. The Hindu social hierarchy emphasized that those in higher castes typically had lighter skin than those in lower castes. So, they are at an advantage. Colorism in India was also fed by the attitudes of Europeans, who favored lighter-skinned people for administrative positions and other prominent social positions; so power was conceptually intertwined with light skin. Rich Indians often tend to be light-skinned due to less exposure to sun. Also, individuals were judged by their occupation; and being born into a lineage of, say, farmers, would typically make one unable to leave said lineage. Migration between occupations was rare, and though the caste system's legality was altered in 1948, the practice is still common in many parts of the country. As these factors generated the caste system, it grew to include both economic standing and societal positioning. Existing prejudices also influenced European officials. This sentiment remains. Colorism has societal implications, many of which severely harm socioeconomic mobility of darker-skinned Indians. These can play out in gender stereotyping and regional discrimination. Studies of melanin index (MI) in individuals across regions show that there are variations in skin color, which contribute to the level of discrimination darker-skinned individuals face in these respective regions.  In India, especially some regions, dark-skinned people are often seen as "dirty" and of lower status than lighter-skinned ones. In Maharashtra state, a group of young tribal girls trained to be flight crew through a government scholarship program that aimed to empower women; however, the program seems to have actually disempowered darker-skinned women. Most of the girls were denied employment due to their darker skin tone. A few of them got jobs, but only as out-of-sight ground crew. This inherent racism further fuels the notion that light skin is often associated with improved living conditions and a higher standard of living. This notion typically affects Indian women more than men; this notion is backed by gender rights in India, which are not very progressive and they often harm upward mobility of individuals in professional settings and impose restrictions on their social lives based on their gender. This is a case where two cleavages fuel one another (see Intersectionality). Men with darker skin often can, in a societally-accepted manner, marry women with lighter skin. But darker women do not have the same privileges as darker men; largely due to the patriarchal institutions that riddle India to this day.

Other forms of colorism in India can be seen in the cosmetic industry, where "fairness" creams meant to lighten skin are popular, and in the Indian film and media industry, where most hires are light-skinned, and actresses are often photoshopped to look lighter. Skin lightening is shown to have significant detrimental effects on both mental and physical health, especially for women, who are more heavily burdened by men in relation to this issue. It is a burden on one's mental health in a societal setting; users of skin creams, on average, remain dissatisfied with their complexion even after using the product. Unregulated products can contain harmful chemicals which can cause dermatitis, chemical burns, and in severe cases, increase the likelihood of skin cancer and melanoma. As these mechanisms interplay with the presence of existent capitalistic institutions that control much of today's world, it is no secret that the skin-lightening industry benefits this system through the exploitation of vulnerable individuals.

In the wake of the murder of George Floyd that led to protests worldwide, the debate about colorism and skin tone in India has been discussed in several media outlets, and as part of the general critique a big Indian matchmaking website, Shaadi.com, removed a filter where one could mark skin color preferences for their potential partner. Outside of India, dark-skinned individuals and immigrants are typically treated with the same low level of social respect and acceptance, similar to experiences they endure within their country.

Sri Lanka 
Fair skin is a beauty ideal in contemporary Sri Lankan society but has its roots in ancient Sri Lankan beauty ideals. Fairness products and other products that include whitening agents are commonly sold in Sri Lanka and are popular among females. Fair skinned actors and actresses feature prominently in Bollywood films and Korean dramas both of which are widely popular and influential in Sri Lanka.

United Arab Emirates

In many places, people with white skin get better treatment and salaries.

Africa 

During the European colonial period, travelers in Africa emphasized and added to a European discourse of black womanhood that attributed a big body to all black women. This was a symbol of 'otherness', their inferior phenotype, and backward culture and intellect.

Although, today the thick Black female body is celebrated but it does not negate the fact of white colonialist views and the prevalence of white beauty standards. "The voluptuous black female body is still perceived as unattractive, ugly, and grotesque—the opposite of beautiful—when seen through the prism of white supremacy."

In some parts of Africa, women with lighter skin are thought to be more beautiful and likely to find more success than women with darker skin tones. Often this barrier leads to women turning to skin lightening treatments, many of which are harmful to the body.

Historically, the cause of skin lightening dates back to European colonialism, where individuals with lighter skin received greater privilege than those of darker tones. This built a racial hierarchy and color ranking within colonized African nations, leaving psychological effects on many of the darker skinned individuals.

Colorism affects both women and men in African countries, but it has taken hold of the beauty standards associated with a woman's ability to find success and marriage. The number of women across African countries using bleaching products have gone up with 77% of Nigerian women, 52% of Senegalese women, and 25% of Malian women using lightening products. Der Spiegel reports that in Ghana, "When You Are Light-Skinned, You Earn More" and that, "Some pregnant women take tablets in the hopes that it will lead their child to be born with fair skin. Some apply bleaching lotion... to their babies, in the hopes that it will improve their child's chances."

Europe 

Research reveals that police practices, such as racial profiling, over-policing in areas which are populated by minorities and in-group bias may cause disproportionately high numbers of crime suspects among racial minorities in Europe. Research also suggests there may be discrimination by the judicial system, which contributes to a higher number of convictions for racial minorities in Sweden, the Netherlands, Italy, Germany, Denmark and France.

Several meta-analyses find extensive evidence of ethnic and racial discrimination in hiring in the North American and European labor markets. A 2016 meta-analysis of 738 correspondence tests in 43 separate studies done in OECD countries in 1990-2015 finds that there is extensive racial discrimination in hiring decisions in Europe and North America. Equivalent minority candidates need to send around 50% more applications to be invited for an interview than majority candidates.

A 2014 meta-analysis found extensive evidence of racial and ethnic discrimination in the housing market of several European countries. These include being discriminated against in the rental market, a lack of ability to successfully integrate into society, discrimination based on foreign origin, and preferential hiring based upon being a native citizen.

A 2017 experimental study found that the Dutch discriminate against non-Western immigrants in trust games. A 2021 study found discrimination against parents with Muslim names in the Danish education system.

Latin America

Brazil 

Brazil has the world's largest population of African descent outside Africa. Racially mixed individuals with lighter skin generally have higher rates of social mobility than racially mixed people with darker skin. There is a disproportionately higher number of people among the mostly European descended elites than there is among those elites whose members are of visible African descent. There are large health, education and income disparities between the races in Brazil. A recent study even finds that skin color is a stronger predictor of social inequality in Brazil than 'race' (i.e. 'race-color' categories used on the Brazilian census); and highlights that socially perceived skin color and 'race' are not the same thing. Even though browns/mixeds and blacks comprise more than 50 percent of the population, they comprise less than 25 percent of all of the elected politicians.

A 2016 study, using twins as a control for neighborhood and family characteristics, found that the nonwhite twin is disadvantaged in the educational system. A 2015 study on racial bias in teacher evaluations in Brazil found that Brazilian math teachers gave better grading assessments of white students than equally proficient and equivalently well-behaved black students.

A 2018 paper found that discriminatory hiring and retention policies accounted for 6-8% of the overall racial wage gap.

Chile 

In Chile, there is a wide range of diversity from other cultures and ethnic backgrounds. The diversity in Chile sees colorism through social-economic status, accommodating the preexisting notion that darker skin complexions are less valued. A 2016 study found that Chilean schoolteachers expected less from their dark-skinned students (morenos) than they expected from their light-skinned students (blancos). Even the differences between being dark and being tanned carry different types of status, being tanned means that people have more money because they have time to go to the beach and buy tanning products, but due to the history of colonization, being darker skinned means that people are automatically considered members of the lower classes. Current studies have revealed that many Chileans want to have a lighter pigmentation and they even consider themselves White despite the fact that they have a mixture of skin tones.

Mexico 

A 2017 study revealed a 45% gap in educational achievement between the darkest- and lightest-skinned White Mexicans and that wealth in the country similarly correlated to skin color.

United States

History

European colonizers created a racial hierarchy and a race-based ideology, which led to the formation of a structural system of oppression that benefited individuals of European descent over individuals of African descent. Biological differences in skin color were used to justify the enslavement and oppression of Africans and Native Americans, leading to the development of a social hierarchy that placed people of European descent at the top and placed people of African descent at the bottom. Enslaved people with lighter complexions (usually stemming from the sexual assault of enslaved African women), were allowed to perform less strenuous tasks, like domestic duties, while darker-skinned enslaved people were forced to engage in hard labor, which they usually performed outdoors.

African-Americans with greater European ancestry and a lighter skin color were considered smarter than and therefore superior to their darker-skinned counterparts. As a result, they were given greater opportunities for education and the acquisition of land and property. Colorism was a device used by European colonists, to create division between enslaved Africans and further the idea that being as close to white as possible was the ideal image. One of the first forms of colorism was slave owners deciding that only light-skinned enslaved people would work in the house while the darker-skinned ones were subjected to the harsh conditions of the fields. This practice led to a clear division between the slaves, undermining their solidarity against the slave owners.

A variety of specific cutoff tests for skin color emerged, the most famous one was the brown paper bag test. If people's skins were darker than the color of a brown paper bag, they were considered "too dark".  While the origin of this test is unclear, it is best attested to in 20th-century Black culture. During the time when African Americans were forced into slavery, slave owners would use the "paper bag test", which compared their skin color to a paper bag to distinguish whether their complexion was too dark to work inside of the house. African Americans' desire for lighter complexions and European features goes back to slavery. Enslaved people that had lighter complexions would have the privilege of working indoors while enslaved people with darker skin were required to work outside in the fields. The complexions of African American slaves reflected how they got treated and the severity of their punishments if they did not comply to the lifestyle that they were forced into. The access to and resources to purchase skincare products or services impacted the notions of colorism among African American women, since enslaved and impoverished black women were more limited in their grooming, which affected the way they were treated by their masters. For example, light-skinned black women were marketed as "Negroes fit for domestic service" in their masters' homes.

In addition to the bag test, the comb test and the door test were also used.  The comb test was used to measure the kinkiness of a person's hair. The objective was for the comb to be able to pass through the hair without stopping. The door test was popular in some African American clubs and churches. The people who were in charge of those clubs and churches would paint their doors a certain shade of brown, similar to the brown paper bag test, and if people's skins were darker than the color of the doors, they were not admitted into the establishments. These tests were used to measure what level of "blackness" was and was not acceptable in the world. Due to lighter-skinned slaves being allowed to work in the house, they were more likely to be educated than darker slaves were. Hence the stereotype that dark people were stupid and ignorant. Scholars predict that in the future, the preferred color of beauty will not be black or white, but mixed. Scholars also predict that the United States will adopt a "multicultural matrix" which will help bridge the racial gap in efforts to achieve racial harmony, termed by some a coming "Browning of America". The matrix has four components: the mixed race will help fix racial issues, it serves as a sign of racial progress, it suggests that racism is a thing and it also suggests that the focus on race is racist due to the lack of racial neutrality. At the same time, some Americans view this "browning" as a sort of demographic replacement, which has led to anxiety among some white Americans who feel that their identity and culture are under attack and will be displaced without changes to the US immigration system. Eric Peter Kaufmann explored these views among American whites and internationally in the 2018 book Whiteshift: Populism, Immigration and the Future of White Majorities.

A parallel as well as an opposite critique of this theory is made by black scholars, who state that racial neutrality will not eliminate discrimination based on skin color as long as some races continue to be negatively perceived and unfairly treated. As such, racial "browning" would just be another way to erase dark skin without correcting the bad way in which it is perceived. From this point of view, racial harmonization is not a valid response to racism at all. In his 2008 book The Browning of America and the Evasion of Social Justice, Ronald R. Sundstrom writes,

Business 
A 2014 meta-analysis of racial discrimination in product markets found extensive evidence of minority applicants being quoted higher prices for products. A 1995 study found that car dealers "quoted significantly lower prices to white males than to black or female test buyers using identical, scripted bargaining strategies." A 2013 study found that eBay sellers of iPods received 21 percent more offers if a white hand held the iPod in the photo than a black hand.

A 2014 study in the Journal of Economic Growth found that anti-black violence and terrorism, as well as segregation laws, reduced the economic activity and innovation of African Americans.

African-Americans have historically faced discrimination in terms of getting access to credit. A 2020 audit study of 17 banks found that black business owners who sought loans under the Paycheck Protection Program got substantially worse treatment than white business owners. Bus drivers engaged in substantial discrimination against black passengers relative to white passengers.

Criminal justice
Research suggests that police practices, such as racial profiling, over-policing in areas which are populated by minorities and in-group bias may all result in disproportionately high numbers of racial minorities among crime suspects. Research also suggests that there is discrimination by the judicial system, which contributes to a higher number of convictions and unfavorable sentencing for racial minorities. Further research indicates that even when controlling for income and all other factors, children from father-absent families (mother only, mother-stepfather, and relatives/other) were much more likely to be incarcerated  The disproportionate single-parent households of black youths to those in white family structures is respectively 64% to 24% as of 2019

Policing, arrests, and surveillance
A 2019 study, which made use of a dataset of the racial makeup of every U.S. sheriff over a 25-year period, found that "ratio of Black-to-White arrests is significantly higher under White sheriffs" and that the effects appear to be "driven by arrests for less-serious offenses and by targeting Black crime types."

In-group bias has also been observed when it comes to traffic citations, as black and white cops are more likely to cite out-groups.

A 2019 study by the National Institute of Standards and Technology found that facial-recognition systems were substantially more likely to misidentify the faces of racial minorities. Some ethnic groups, such as Asian-Americans and African-American, were up to 100 times more likely to be misidentified than white men.

A 2018 study in the journal Proceedings of the National Academy of Sciences found that tall young black men are especially likely to receive unjustified attention by law enforcement. The authors furthermore found a "causal link between perceptions of height and perceptions of threat for Black men, particularly for perceivers who endorse stereotypes that Black people are more threatening than White people."

Analysis of more than 20 million traffic stops in North Carolina showed that blacks were more than twice as likely as whites to be pulled over by police for traffic stops, and that blacks were more likely to be searched following the stop. There were no significant difference in the likelihood that Hispanics would be pulled over, but Hispanics were much more likely to be searched following a traffic stop than whites. When the study controlled for searches in high-crime areas, it still found that police disproportionately targeted black individuals. These racial disparities were particularly pronounced for young men. The study found that whites who were searched were more likely to carry contraband than blacks and Hispanics. A 2020 study in the journal Nature found that black drivers were stopped more often than white drivers, and that the threshold by which police decided to search black and Hispanic drivers was lower than that for whites (judging by the rate at which contraband was found in searches). A 2021 study in the Quarterly Journal of Economics found similar results. A 2021 study in the American Economic Review found that minorities were significantly less likely to receive discounts on their traffic tickets than White drivers; the study estimated that 42% of Florida Highway Patrol officers practiced racial discrimination.

A 2013 report by the American Civil Liberties Union found that blacks were "3.73 times more likely than whites to be arrested for marijuana possession," even though "blacks and whites use drugs, including marijuana, at similar rates."

Police killings and use of force

Racism is also present in policing. For instance, the United Kingdom's 'stop and search' laws have been disproportionately used against black people, specifically black men. Excessive force against black people is also common in the United States. Police in the United States disproportionately killed unarmed black Americans compared to unarmed white Americans. These discrepancies led to the creation of the 'Black Lives Matter' (BLM). The movement began in the US in 2012, after the killing of Trayvon Martin, a 17 year old unarmed African-American, by George Zimmerman. Zimmerman claimed self defense and was acquitted of murder at trial. The movement skyrocketed after many high profile killings of unarmed African Americans by the police, including the murder of George Floyd. However, BLM also faces criticism and the 'All Lives Matter' (ALM) emerged as a response. Thus, there is an ongoing debate on the motifs of the ALM. Former US president, Donald Trump and some other Republicans declared the BLM as racist and the ALM as more inclusive and color-blind.

A 2016 study by Roland G. Fryer, Jr. of the National Bureau of Economic Research found that while overall "blacks are 21 percent more likely than whites to be involved in an interaction with police in which at least a weapon is drawn" and that in the raw data from New York City's Stop and Frisk program "blacks and Hispanics are more than fifty percent more likely to have an interaction with police which involves any use of force" after "[p]artitioning the data in myriad ways, we find no evidence of racial discrimination in officer-involved shootings." The study did find bias against blacks and Hispanics in non-lethal and less-extreme lethal violence, stating that "as the intensity of force increases (e.g. handcuffing civilians without arrest, drawing or pointing a weapon, or using pepper spray or a baton), the probability that any civilian is subjected to such treatment is small, but the racial difference remains surprisingly constant", and noted that "[u]ntil recently, data on officer-involved shootings were extremely rare and contained little information on the details surrounding an incident".

After the NBER study was published in the peer reviewed Journal of Political Economy, a comment on it by Steven Durlauf and (Nobel Prize in Economics recipient) James Heckman of the Harris School of Public Policy Studies at the University of Chicago said, "[i]n our judgment, this paper does not establish credible evidence on the presence or absence of discrimination against African Americans in police shootings." The NBER study's author, Roland G. Fryer Jr., responded by saying Durlauf and Heckman erroneously claim that his sample is "based on stops". Further, he states that the "vast majority of the data... is gleaned from 911 calls for service in which a civilian requests police presence."

A 2018 study in American Journal of Public Health found the mortality rate by police per 100,000 was 1.9 to 2.4 for black men, 0.8 to 1.2 for Hispanic men and 0.6 to 0.7 for white men. Reports by the Department of Justice have also found that police in Baltimore, Maryland, and Ferguson, Missouri, systemically stop, search (in some cases strip-search) and harass black residents. A January 2017 report by the DOJ concluded that the Chicago Police Department had "unconstitutionally engaged in a pattern of excessive and deadly force" and an independent task force created by the mayor of Chicago stated that police "have no regard for the sanctity of life when it comes to people of color." A 2018 study found that minorities were disproportionately killed by police, but that white officers were no more likely to use lethal force on minorities than minority officers. A 2019 study in the Journal of Politics found that police officers were more likely to use lethal force on blacks, but that this "most likely driven by higher rates of police contact among African Americans rather than racial differences in the circumstances of the interaction and officer bias in the application of lethal force."

A 2019 study in the journal Proceedings of the National Academy of Sciences found that blacks and American Indian/Alaska Natives are more likely to be killed by police than whites, and that Latino men are more likely to be killed than white men. According to the study, "for young men of color, police use of force is among the leading causes of death." A separate Proceedings of the National Academy of Sciences (PNAS) study found that there were no racial disparities in police shootings by white police; the findings of the study were disputed by Princeton University scholars who argued that the study's method and dataset made it impossible for the authors to reach that conclusion. The authors of the original PNAS study corrected their article following the criticism by the Princeton scholars. A study by Texas A&M University economists, which rectified some problems of selection bias identified in the literature above, found that white police officers were more likely to use force and guns than black police, and that white officers were five times as likely to use gun force in predominantly black neighborhoods. A 2020 American Political Science Review study estimated that 39% of uses of force by police against blacks and Hispanics in New York City was racially discriminatory.

Charging decisions
A 2018 study in the Journal of Empirical Legal Studies found that law enforcement officers in Texas who could charge shoplifters with two types of crimes (one more serious, one less so) due to a vaguely worded statute were more likely to charge blacks and Hispanics with the more serious crime.

A 2017 report by the Marshall Project found that killings of black men by whites were far more likely to be deemed "justifiable" than killings by any other combination of races.

Legal representation, bail decisions, trials, and convictions
A 2019 audit study found that lawyers are less likely to take on clients with black-sounding names than white-sounding names.

A 2018 study in the Quarterly Journal of Economics found that bail judges in Miami and Philadelphia were racially biased against black defendants, as white defendants had higher rates of pretrial misconduct than black defendants. A 2022 study in the American Economic Review found that New York City judges engaged in racial discrimination against black defendants in bail decisions.

A 2012 study found that "(i) juries formed from all-white jury pools convict black defendants significantly (16 percentage points) more often than white defendants, and (ii) this gap in conviction rates is entirely eliminated when the jury pool includes at least one black member."

A 2018 National Bureau of Economic Research experiment found that law students, economics students and practicing lawyers who watched 3D Virtual Reality videos of court trials (where the researchers altered the race of the defendants) showed a racial bias against minorities.

DNA exonerations in rape cases strongly suggests that the wrongful conviction rate is higher for black convicts than white convicts.

Sentencing
Research has found evidence of in-group bias, where "black (white) juveniles who are randomly assigned to black (white) judges are more likely to get incarcerated (as opposed to being placed on probation), and they receive longer sentences."

A 2018 study in the American Economic Journal: Applied Economics found that judges gave longer sentences, in particular to black defendants, after their favorite team lost a home game.

A 2014 study in the Journal of Political Economy found that 9% of the black-white gap in sentencing could not be accounted for. The elimination of unexplained sentencing disparities would reduce "the level of black men in federal prison by 8,000–11,000 men [out of black male prison population of 95,000] and save $230–$320 million per year in direct costs." The majority of the unexplained sentencing disparity appears to occur at the point when prosecutors decide to bring charges carrying "mandatory minimum" sentences. A 2018 paper by Alma Cohen and Crystal Yang of Harvard Law School found that "Republican-appointed judges give substantially longer prison sentences to black offenders versus observably similar non-black offenders compared to Democratic-appointed judges within the same district court."

In criminal sentencing, medium to dark-skinned African Americans are likely to receive sentences 2.6 years longer than those of whites or light-skinned African Americans. When a white victim is involved, those with more "black" features are likely to receive a much more severe punishment.

A 2016 report by the Sarasota Herald-Tribune found that Florida judges sentence black defendants to far longer prison sentences than whites with the same background. For the same drug possession crimes, blacks were sentenced to double the time of whites. Blacks were given longer sentences in 60 percent of felony cases, 68 percent of the most serious first-degree crimes, 45 percent of burglary cases and 30 percent of battery cases. For third-degree felonies (the least serious types of felonies in Florida), white judges sentenced blacks to twenty percent more time than whites, whereas black judges gave more balanced sentences.

A 2017 report by the United States Sentencing Commission (USSC) found, "after controlling for a wide variety of sentencing factors" (such as age, education, citizenship, weapon possession and prior criminal history), that "black male offenders received sentences on average 19.1 percent longer than similarly situated White male offenders."

A 2014 study on the application of the death penalty in Connecticut over the period 1973–2007 found "that minority defendants who kill white victims are capitally charged at substantially higher rates than minority defendants who kill minorities... There is also strong and statistically significant evidence that minority defendants who kill whites are more likely to end up with capital sentences than comparable cases with white defendants."

Prison system, parole, and pardons
A 2016 analysis by the New York Times "of tens of thousands of disciplinary cases against inmates in 2015, hundreds of pages of internal reports and three years of parole decisions found that racial disparities were embedded in the prison experience in New York." Blacks and Latinos were sent more frequently to solitary and held there for longer durations than whites. The New York Times analysis found that the disparities were the greatest for violations where the prison guards had much discretion, such as disobeying orders, but smaller for violations that required physical evidence, such as possessing contraband.

According to a 2011 ProPublica analysis, "whites are nearly four times as likely as minorities to win a pardon, even when the type of crime and severity of sentence are taken into account."

Education 
The U.S. Supreme Court ruled in Brown v. Board of Education (1954) that integrated, equal schools be accessible to all children unbiased to skin color. Currently in the United States, not all state funded schools are equally funded. Schools are funded by "federal, state, and local governments" while "states play a large and increasing role in education funding." "Property taxes support most of the funding that local government provides for education." Schools in lower income areas get less funding than schools in higher income areas, because all funding for education is based on property taxes. The U.S. Department of Education reports, "many high-poverty schools receive less than their fair share of state and local funding, leaving students in high-poverty schools with fewer resources than schools which are attended by their wealthier peers." The U.S. Department of Education also says this fact affects "more than 40% of low-income schools". Children of color are much more likely to suffer from poverty than white children.

A 2015 study which used correspondence tests "found that when they are considering requests from prospective students who are seeking mentoring in the future, faculty were significantly more responsive to White males than they were to all other categories of students, collectively, particularly in higher-paying disciplines and private institutions." Through affirmative action, elite colleges consider a broader range of experiences for minority applicants.

A 2016 study in the journal PNAS found that blacks and Hispanics were systemically underrepresented in education programs for gifted children where teachers and parents referred students to those programs; when a universal screening program which was based on IQ was used to refer students, the disparity was significantly reduced.

The phrase "brown paper bag test", or paper bag party, along with the "ruler test" refers to a ritual which was once done by certain African-American sororities and fraternities which would not let anyone into the group if his or her skin was darker than a brown paper bag. Spike Lee's film School Daze satirized this practice at historically black colleges and universities. Along with the "paper bag test", guidelines for acceptance among the lighter ranks included the "comb test" and the "pencil test", which tested the coarseness of one's hair, and the "flashlight test", which tested a person's profile in order to make sure that their features measured up or were close enough to those of the Caucasian race.

A 2013 study used spectrophotometer readings to quantify the skin color of respondents. White women experience discrimination in education, with those women having darker skin graduating from college at lower rates than those women with lighter skin. This precise and repeatable test of skin color revealed that white women experience skin color discrimination in education at levels which are consistent with the levels of skin color discrimination which are experienced by African-Americans. White men are not affected in this way.

Health 
A 2019 review of the literature in the Annual Review of Public Health found that structural racism, cultural racism, and individual-level discrimination are "a fundamental cause of adverse health outcomes for racial/ethnic minorities and racial/ethnic inequities in health."

A 1999 study found that doctors treat black and white patients differently, even when their medical files were statistically identical. When shown patient histories and asked to make judgments about heart disease, the doctors were much less likely to recommend cardiac catheterization (a helpful procedure) to black patients. A 2015 study found that pediatricians were more likely to undertreat appendicitis pain in black children than white children. A 2017 study found that medical staff which was treating anterior cruciate ligament (ACL) injuries perceived black collegiate athletes as having higher pain tolerance than white athletes. A study by University of Toronto and Ohio State University economists found substantial evidence of racial discrimination against black veterans in terms of medical treatment and awarding of disability pensions in the late 19th and early 20th century; the discrimination was substantial enough to account for nearly the entire black-white mortality gap in the period. A 2019 study in Science found that one widely used algorithm to assess health risks falsely concluded that "Black patients are healthier than equally sick White patients", thus leading health care providers to provide lower levels of care for black patients. A 2020 study found that "when Black newborns are cared for by Black physicians, the mortality penalty they suffer, as compared with White infants, is halved."

A 2018 ProPublica analysis found that African Americans and Native Americans were underrepresented in clinical trials of new drugs. Fewer than 5% of patients were African-American, even though they make up 13.4% of the total US population. African-Americans were even underrepresented in trials involving drugs intended for diseases that disproportionately affect African-Americans. As a result, African-Americans who had exhausted all other treatments have weaker access to experimental treatments.

Studies have argued that there are racial disparities in how the media and politicians act when they are faced with cases of drug addiction in which the victims are primarily black rather than white, citing the examples of how society responded differently to the crack epidemic than it responded to the opioid epidemic.

Housing and land 

A 2014 meta-analysis found extensive evidence of racial discrimination in the American housing market. Minority applicants for housing needed to make many more enquiries to view properties. Geographical steering of African-Americans in US housing remains significant. A 2003 study found "evidence that agents interpret an initial housing request as an indication of a customer's preferences, but also are more likely to withhold a house from all customers when it is in an integrated suburban neighborhood (redlining). Moreover, agents' marketing efforts increase with asking price for white, but not for black, customers; blacks are more likely than whites to see houses in suburban, integrated areas (steering); and the houses agents show are more likely to deviate from the initial request when the customer is black than when the customer is white. These three findings are consistent with the possibility that agents act upon the belief that some types of transactions are relatively unlikely for black customers (statistical discrimination)." Real estate appraisers discriminate against black homeowners. Historically, there was extensive and long-lasting racial discrimination against African-Americans in the housing and mortgage markets in the United States, as well as massive discrimination against black farmers whose numbers massively declined in post-WWII America due to local and federal anti-black policies. Government actions in part facilitated racial discrimination in the housing market, leading to substantial and persistent racial residential segregation, and contributing to the racial wealth gap .

According to a 2019 analysis by University of Pittsburgh economists, blacks faced a two-fold penalty due to the racially segregated housing market: rental prices increased in blocks when they underwent racial transition whereas home values declined in neighborhoods that blacks moved into. A 2016 study found that industrial use zoning in Chicago tended to be allocated to neighborhoods which were populated by racial minorities.

A report by the federal Department of Housing and Urban Development revealed that when the department sent African-Americans and whites to look at apartments, African-Americans were shown fewer apartments to rent and fewer houses for sale than whites were. A 2017 study found "that applications [for Airbnb housing] from guests with distinctively African American names are 16 percent less likely to be accepted relative to identical guests with distinctively white names." A 2020 audit study of Boston found that prospective white renters were 32 percentage points more likely to be shown an apartment than similar prospective black renters.

A 2017 paper by Troesken and Walsh found that pre-20th century cities "created and sustained residential segregation through private norms and vigilante activity." However, "when these private arrangements began to break down during the early 1900s" whites started "lobbying municipal governments for segregation ordinances". As a result, cities passed ordinances which "prohibited members of the majority racial group on a given city block from selling or renting property to members of another racial group" between 1909 and 1917.

Government policies have contributed significantly to the racial gap in homeownership, because various government policies and benefits have made it easier for whites to become homeowners relative to blacks. A 2017 study by Federal Reserve Bank of Chicago economists found that the practice of redlining—the practice whereby banks discriminated against the inhabitants of certain neighborhoods—had a persistent adverse impact on the neighborhoods, with redlining affecting homeownership rates, home values and credit scores in 2010. Since many African-Americans could not access conventional home loans, they had to turn to predatory lenders (who charged high interest rates). Due to lower home ownership rates, slumlords were able to rent out apartments that would otherwise be owned. A 2019 analysis estimated that predatory housing contracts targeting African-Americans in Chicago in the 1950s and 1960s cost black families between $3 billion and $4 billion in wealth.

A 2017 study in Research & Politics found that white supporters of Donald Trump became less likely to approve of federal housing assistance when they were shown an image of a black man.

A 2018 study in the American Sociological Review found that housing market professionals (real estate agents, housing developers, mortgage appraisers and home value appraisers) held derogatory racial views about black and Latino individuals and neighborhoods whereas white individuals and neighborhoods were beneficiaries of widely shared, positive racial beliefs.

A 2018 experimental study by University of Illinois and Duke University economists found that real estate agents and housing providers systematically recommended homes in neighborhoods with higher poverty rates, greater pollution, higher crime rates, fewer college educated families, and fewer skilled workers to minority individuals who had all the same characteristics as white individuals except ethnic differences.

A 2018 study in the American Political Science Review found that white voters in areas which experienced massive African-American population growth between 1940 and 1960 were more likely to vote for California Proposition 14 (1964) which sought to enshrine legal protections for landlords and property owners who discriminated against "colored" buyers and renters.

A 2018 study in the Journal of Politics found extensive evidence of discrimination against blacks and Hispanics in the New York City rental market. A 2018 study in the journal Regional Science and Urban Economics found that there was discrimination against blacks and Arab males in the U.S. rental market. A 2018 study in the Journal of Regional Science found that "black households pay more for identical housing in identical neighborhoods than their white counterparts... In neighborhoods with the smallest fraction white, the premium is about 0.6%. In neighborhoods with the largest fraction white, it is about 2.4%."

A 2022 study found that ethnic minority hosts on Airbnb charge lower prices due to discrimination by consumers.

Labor market 
Several meta-analyses find extensive evidence of ethnic and racial discrimination in hiring in the American labor market. A 2017 meta-analysis found "no change in the levels of discrimination against African Americans since 1989, although we do find some indication of declining discrimination against Latinos." A 2016 meta-analysis of 738 correspondence tests – tests where identical CVs for stereotypically black and white names were sent to employers – in 43 separate studies conducted in OECD countries between 1990 and 2015 finds that there is extensive racial discrimination in hiring decisions in Europe and North America. These correspondence tests showed that equivalent minority candidates need to send around 50% more applications to be invited for an interview than majority candidates. A study that examine the job applications of actual people provided with identical résumés and similar interview training showed that African-American applicants with no criminal record were offered jobs at a rate as low as white applicants who had criminal records. A 2018 National Bureau of Economic Research paper found evidence of racial bias in how CVs were evaluated. A 2020 study found that there is not only discrimination towards minorities in callback rates in audit studies, but that the discrimination gets more severe after the callbacks in terms of job offers. A 2022 study involving 83,000 job applications sent to the 108 largest U.S. employers found that employers consistently favored applications by distinctively white names over black names. A 2021 study found discrimination among Swiss job recruiters against immigrant and minority groups.

Research suggests that light-skinned African American women have higher salaries and greater job satisfaction than dark-skinned women. Being "too black" has recently been acknowledged by the U.S. Federal courts in an employment discrimination case under Title VII of the Civil Rights Act of 1964. In Etienne v. Spanish Lake Truck & Casino Plaza, LLC the United States Court of Appeals for the Fifth Circuit, determined that an employee who was told on several occasions that her manager thought she was "too black" to do various tasks, found that the issue of the employee's skin color rather than race itself, played a key role in an employer's decision to keep the employee from advancing. A 2018 study found evidence suggesting discrimination towards immigrants with darker skin colors.

A 2019 experimental study found that there was a bias against blacks, Latinos and women in hirings of postdocs in the fields of biology and physics. A 2020 study, which used a natural experiment with sun exposure and tans found that darker-skinned individuals are discriminated against in the labor market.

A 2008 study found that black service providers receive lower tips than white service providers. Research shows that "ban the box" (the removal of the check box asking job applicants if they have criminal records) leads employers to discriminate against young, black low-skilled applicants, possibly because employers simply assume these applicants have checkered pasts when they are not able to confirm it.

Media
Colorism in movies, print, and music can take place in several forms. It can be the representation of people of color in an ill light, the hiring of actors based on their skin color, the use of colors in costumes with the intention to differentiate good and evil characters, or simply failing to represent people of color at all.

Cultural products represent societal values and offer an approach to see transitions in those values. Children's stories investigate cultural products for cultural motifs and values, which according to Bettelheim (1962) are major ways by which children integrate in the culture. Children's stories are very important to examine value constructs such as beauty ideals. In the eighteenth and nineteenth centuries, fairy tales taught girls and young women to integrate into the patriarchal culture. Women were supposed to be domesticated, respectable, and attractive to get married. Boys and girls were assigned gendered roles and attitudes in the fairy tales. Research by Pescosolido, Grauerholz, and Milkie (1997) found "that during periods of intense racial conflict and significant political gains by African Americans", Black characters almost vanished from children's books. Thus, children's media imitates and is formed by the changing social and power relations within different groups. As a result, children's literature can reflect important political and social transitions in the past. The Brothers Grimm in the nineteenth century, echo how the extensiveness of the feminine beauty ideal has transitioned over time. The tales that survive today are read by children from different social classes and racial groups. Moreover, it continues to incorporate symbolic imagery that preserves existing, race, class, and gender system.

Characters' physical appearance is regularly quoted in the fairytales. There is a particular emphasis on fair skin tone of the 'princesses'. Young women's beauty is highlighted more than older women and men's appearance. There is a strong link between beauty and goodness and ugliness and evil. One story for example, says, "A widow had two daughters, one who was beautiful and industrious, the other ugly and lazy". It shows how ugliness is punished while beauty is rewarded. Beauty is also linked to race and class. "In The White Bride and the Black Bride, the mother and daughter are "cursed" with blackness and ugliness". Thus, black color is automatically associated with not being pretty. As a result, beauty is connected not only with goodness but also with whiteness and economic privilege. Stories such as 'Snow White' emphasizes how fair skin tone would lead to marrying a princess because he would be attracted to her 'beauty'. The aspect of 'fairness' is deeply ingrained with beauty in these fairytales, that it is difficult to imagine any without glorifying it.

A 2017 report by Travis L. Dixon (of the University of Illinois at Urbana-Champaign) found that major media outlets tend to portray black families as dysfunctional and dependent while white families are portrayed as stable. These portrayals may give the impression that poverty and welfare are primarily black issues. According to Dixon, this can reduce public support for social safety programs and lead to stricter welfare requirements. A 2018 study found that media portrayals of Muslims were substantially more negative than for other religious groups (even when controlling for relevant factors). A 2019 study described media portrayals of minority women in crime news stories as based on "outdated and harmful stereotypes".

African Americans with lighter skin tone and "European features", such as lighter eyes, and smaller noses and lips have more opportunities in the media industry. For example, film producers hire lighter-skinned African Americans more often, television producers choose lighter-skinned cast members, and magazine editors choose African American models that resemble European features. A content analysis conducted by Scott and Neptune (1997) shows that less than one percent of advertisements in major magazines featured African American models. When African Americans did appear in advertisements they were mainly portrayed as athletes, entertainers or unskilled laborers. In addition, seventy percent of the advertisements that features animal print included African American women. Animal print reinforces the stereotypes that African Americans are animalistic in nature, sexually active, less educated, have lower income, and extremely concerned with personal appearances. Concerning African American males in the media, darker-skinned men are more likely to be portrayed as violent or more threatening, influencing the public perception of African American men. Since dark-skinned males are more likely to be linked to crime and misconduct, many people develop preconceived notions about the characteristics of black men.

A 2021 study found that U.S. media portrayals of Muslims and Muslim Americans was substantially more negative than media coverage of Blacks, Latinos, and Asian Americans.

Colorism was, and still is, very evident in the media. An example of this is the minstrel shows that were popular during and after slavery. Minstrel shows were a very popular form of theater that involved white and black people in black face portraying black people while doing demeaning things. The actors painted their faces with black paint and over lined their lips with bright red lipstick to exaggerate and make fun of black people. When minstrel shows died out and television became popular, black actors were rarely hired and when they were, they had very specific roles. These roles included being servants, slaves, idiots, and criminals.

The absence of people of color in media, in settings they can normally should be present, is also called erasure.

Politics 
A 2011 study found that white state legislators of both political parties were less likely to respond to constituents with African-American names. A 2013 study found that in response to e-mail correspondence from a putatively black alias, "nonblack legislators were markedly less likely to respond when their political incentives to do so were diminished, black legislators typically continued to respond even when doing so promised little political reward. Black legislators thus appear substantially more intrinsically motivated to advance blacks' interests."

Some research suggests that white voters' voting behavior is motivated by racial threat. A 2016 study, for instance, found that white Chicago voters' turnout decreased when public housing was reconstructed and 25,000 African Americans displaced. This suggest that white voters' turnout decreased due to not living in proximity to African-Americans.

Voter ID laws have brought on accusations of racial discrimination. In a 2014 review by the Government Accountability Office of the academic literature, three studies out of five found that voter ID laws reduced minority turnout whereas two studies found no significant impact. Disparate impact may also be reflected in access to information about voter ID laws. A 2015 experimental study found that election officials queried about voter ID laws are more likely to respond to emails from a non-Latino white name (70.5% response rate) than a Latino name (64.8% response rate), though response accuracy was similar across groups. Studies have also analyzed racial differences in ID requests rates. A 2012 study in the city of Boston found that black and Hispanic voters were more likely to be asked for ID during the 2008 election. According to exit polls, 23% of whites, 33% of blacks, and 38% of Hispanics were asked for ID, though this effect is partially attributed to black and Hispanics preferring non-peak voting hours when election officials inspected a greater portion of IDs. Precinct differences also confound the data as black and Hispanic voters tended to vote at black and Hispanic-majority precincts. A 2010 study of the 2006 midterm election in New Mexico found that Hispanics were more likely to incur ID requests while early voters, women, and non-Hispanics were less likely to incur requests. A 2009 study of the 2006 midterm election nationwide found that 47% of white voters reported being asked to show photo identification at the polls, compared with 54% of Hispanics and 55% of African Americans." Very few were however denied the vote as a result of voter identification requests. A 2015 study found that turnout among blacks in Georgia was generally higher since the state began enforcing its strict voter ID law. A 2016 study by University of California, San Diego researchers found that voter ID laws "have a differentially negative impact on the turnout of Hispanics, Blacks, and mixed-race Americans in primaries and general elections."

Research by University of Oxford economist Evan Soltas and Stanford political scientist David Broockman suggests that voters act upon racially discriminatory tastes. A 2018 study in Public Opinion Quarterly found that whites, in particular those who had racial resentment, largely attributed Obama's success among African-Americans to his race, and not his characteristics as a candidate and the political preferences of African-Americans. A 2018 study in the journal American Politics Research found that white voters tended to misperceive political candidates from racial minorities as being more ideologically extreme than objective indicators would suggest; this adversely affected the electoral chances for those candidates. A 2018 study in the Journal of Politics found that "when a white candidate makes vague statements, many [nonblack] voters project their own policy positions onto the candidate, increasing support for the candidate. But they are less likely to extend black candidates the same courtesy... In fact, black male candidates who make ambiguous statements are actually punished for doing so by racially prejudiced voters."

A 2018 study found evidence of racial-motivated reasoning as voters assessed President Barack Obama's economic performance. The study found that "Whites attributed more responsibility to Obama under negative economic conditions (i.e., blame) than positive economic conditions (i.e., credit)... Whites attributed equal responsibility to the President and governors for negative economic conditions, but gave more responsibility to governors than Obama for positive conditions. Whites also gave governors more responsibility for state improvements than they gave Obama for national ones." It is also alleged that during his senator run in 2008 against former senator and later on, presidential candidate Hilary Clinton, that Clinton's campaign team intentionally darkened Obama's face while running campaign ads. Although her camp denied the accusations, the intention, whether it be apparent or not, stems from the system of colorism and viewing/equating darker skin tones as bad and in a negative light.

A 2018 study examining "all 24 African American challengers (non-incumbents) from 2000 to 2014 to white challengers from the same party running in the same state for the same office around the same time" found "that white challengers are about three times more likely to win and receive about 13 percentage points more support among white voters. These estimates hold when controlling for a number of potential confounding factors and when employing several statistical matching estimators."

A 2019 study found that whites are less supportive of welfare when they are told that blacks are the majority of recipients (as opposed to whites). However, when informed that most welfare recipients eventually gain jobs and leave the welfare program, this racial bias disappears.

An analysis by MIT political scientist Regina Bateson found that Americans engage in strategic discrimination against racial minority candidates out of a belief that they are less electable than white male candidates: "In the abstract, Americans consider white men more "electable" than equally qualified black and female candidates. Additionally, concerns about winning the votes of white men can cause voters to rate black and female Democratic candidates as less capable of beating Donald Trump in 2020."

A 2019 paper found, using smartphone data, that voters in predominantly black neighborhoods waited far longer at polling places than voters in white neighborhoods.

A 2021 study in the American Political Science Review found that black protestors were perceived to be more violent in protests than white protestors when they were protesting for the same goals.

Beauty

Studies have shown that due to societal influences, many people associate beauty with lighter skin. This is especially evident in children. This belief has led dark-skinned children to feel ashamed of who they are and it also causes them to feel inferior whenever they are compared to people with lighter skin. African American women believe that they would have better luck dating if they had lighter skin, especially when they date African American men.

Globalization has always put women at the receiving end of the spectrum. Beauty pageants are held across the world to evaluate women in terms of the feminine beauty ideal. Beauty pageants are merely sites of female, patriarchal, and sexist objectification of women. Women are excessively judged with regards to the male defined impression of beauty which is tremendously limited. Such competitions emphasize on the appearance of women and executing the ideal standards of beauty, neglecting the diversity between them. Despite the fact that the pageants have tried to diversify their criteria of evaluating beauty standards, the racial, gender and class norms still incorporate the white middle class femininity. There are academies that train women for such pageants which ruins their mental and physical health.

But, it is accepted that the feminine beauty ideal is oppressive and a result of the patriarchal system which objectifies women. It is, however, a reality that many women willingly participate in it and consider beauty as empowering, instead of oppressive. Attaining the 'beauty ideal', i.e. light skin tone, continues to be one of the main ways by which adolescent girls and women achieve social status and self-esteem. Value constructs such as "nice girl" or "feminine beauty" operate as normative restrictions by limiting women's personal freedom and laying the "groundwork for a circumscription of women's potential for power and control in the world". A study shows that most women feel good if they look good. Thus, in today's world self-confidence revolves around the feminine beauty ideal. Dellinger and Williams (1997) found that women who use makeup every day to work are considered as heterosexual, superior, and more skilled than those who do not. On the other hand, the women who fail to meet the beauty standard of achieving a lighter skin through makeup, are seen more negatively. Therefore, women experience workplace discrimination based on their looks, and particularly enhanced skin tone.

Jones and Shorter-Gooden (2003) presented the Lily Complex as a method that modifies and hides the original facial features. This is done to assimilate in the mainstream post-colonial culture and to be accepted according to the Eurocentric standards of beauty. The lily complex stresses that the pressure to follow the feminine beauty ideal that is fake and mostly unachievable can make black women insecure. Their self-esteem is shattered because of the criticisms on their natural appearance. Thus, they consider themselves as undeserving of safety, health and success.

Advertisement campaigns and cosmetic brands also enforce a certain sense of superiority with being white and fair skin tone, encouraging the fairness creams. In India, skin whitening products have been the highest selling with increasing consumers. A print media brand in India published a collage which also organizes the annual beauty pageant. The collage included 30 women with the same skin tone which is towards the fairer end. The limited diversity in the poster imitates India's obsession with a fair skin tone. Moreover, Bollywood films also play a vital part in idealizing fair skinned heroines.

European beauty standards continue to have a long lasting impact within American society — and not only limited to African American women, children, and men, but also on those from different nations. In an article written by Susan L. Bryant, she mentions a study by Kenneth and Mamie Clark referred to as the "Doll Test" which became more widely known because of the Supreme Court Case Brown v. Board of Education. In her article, Bryant states that the European beauty standard is "the notion that the more closely associated a person is with European features, the more attractive he or she is considered; these standards deem attributes that are most closely related to whiteness, such as lighter skin, straight hair, a thin nose and lips, and light colored eyes, as beautiful."

The study was an experiment where 253 black children of ages three to seven were shown two identical dolls, one black and one white, in a nursery and public school located in Arkansas and Massachusetts. Two-thirds of the children indicated that they liked the white dolls better in spite of those children being black. Over the years, the experiment has been repeated and still results in a clear preference for the lighter-skin doll and an internalization of self-hate among black children because of unaddressed European beauty standards. It also found that a child's environment and family life can serve as the biggest influence on their ideals of what is acceptable or unacceptable as to what they define in terms of beauty.

Sports 
A 2018 study found evidence that non-black voters in Heisman Trophy voting were biased against non-black players. A 2021 study found that Black NBA players were 30% more likely to exit the league in any given season than white players with similar player statistics. A 2019 study found that after controlling for objective measures of performance, broadcast commentators were "more likely to discuss the performance and mental abilities of lighter-skinned players and the physical characteristics of darker-skinned players" in the Men's Division I Basketball Tournament.

A 2020 report found that football commentators were more likely to praise white players for their intelligence and leadership qualities, while criticizing black players for lacking those attributes. Black players were four more times likely to be praised for their strength, and seven times more likely to be praised for their speed.

A 2017 study found that racially resentful Whites become less likely to favor salaries for college athletes when they are primed to think about African Americans.

A 2021 audit study found substantial discrimination against individuals with foreign names who asked if they could participate in training sessions with amateur clubs in 22 European countries.

See also

 Afrophobia
 Ancient Egyptian race controversy
 Anti-Indian sentiment
 Anti-Romani sentiment
 Anti-miscegenation laws
 Apartheid
 Aryan race
 Black Codes (United States)
 Blackface
 Black genocide – the notion that African Americans have been subjected to genocide because of racism against African Americans
 Black Hebrew Israelites
 Black is beautiful
 Black Lives Matter
 Black nationalism
 Black people and Mormonism
 Black people and Mormon priesthood
 Black Power
 Black Power movement
 Black separatism
 Black supremacy
 Blonde joke
 Blonde stereotype
 Blonde versus brunette rivalry
 British Israelism
 Christian Identity
 Colonial mentality
 Cultural racism
 Curse and mark of Cain
 Curse of Ham
 Discrimination against people with red hair
 Environmental racism
 Ethnic conflict
 Ethnic nationalism
 Ethnic penalty
 Ethnic violence
 Ethnocentrism
 Eugenics
 Far-right politics
 Far-right subcultures
 Fascism
 Fitzpatrick scale for skin color
 French Israelism
 German Christians (movement)
 Greater East Asia Co-Prosperity Sphere
 Greater Germanic Reich
 Groups claiming affiliation with Israelites
 Index of racism-related articles
 Internalized racism
 Italian Fascism and racism
 Italian racial laws
 Jim Crow laws
 Khazar hypothesis of Ashkenazi ancestry
 Lookism
 Master race
 Mormonism and Pacific Islanders
 Mulatto
 Myanmar nationality law
 Native American people and Mormonism
 Nativism (politics)
 Nazi racial theories
 Nazism
 Neo-Confederates
 Neo-fascism
 Neo-Nazism
 New Order (Nazism)
 Nordicism
 Nordic Israelism
 One-drop rule
 Orientalism
 Persecution of people with albinism
 Person of color
 Positive Christianity
 Pre-Adamite
 Race (human categorization)
 Race and appearance of Jesus
 Racial discrimination
 Racial Equality Proposal
 Racial fetishism
 Racial hierarchy
 Racial nationalism
 Racial policy of Nazi Germany
 Racial segregation
 Racial segregation of churches in the United States
 Racism
 Racism against African Americans
 Racism by country
 Racism in the United States
 Radical right (Europe)
 Radical right (United States)
 Right-wing politics
 Right-wing populism
 Right-wing terrorism
 Sinocentrism
 Skin color of Michael Jackson
 Stereotypes of African Americans
 Stereotypes of groups within the United States
 Supremacism#Racial
 Tanorexia
 Völkisch movement
 White Australia policy
 White nationalism
 White people
 White supremacy
 Xenophobia
 Yellow Peril

References

Further reading
 
 Michael G. Hanchard. 2018. The Spectre of Race: How Discrimination Haunts Western Democracy. Princeton University Press.
 In depth information regarding the Blue Vein Society.
 Don't Play In the Sun by Marita Golden
 
 The Color Complex [Revised Edition]: The Politics of Skin Color in a New Millennium by Kathy Russell, Midge Wilson, and Ronald Hall
 The Blacker the Berry by Wallace Thurman
 Rondilla, Joanne L, and Spickard, Paul. Is Lighter Better?: Skin-tone Discrimination Among Asian Americans. Lanham: Rowman & Littlefield Publishers, 2007. Print.
 
 
 
 The Diversity Paradox: Immigration and the Color Line in Twenty-First Century America. (russelsage review)
 Shikibu, Murasaki. The Tale of Genji. New York: Knopf, 1976. Print.

External links
 Dealing with Colorism: A Step Towards the African Revolution
 Black African Focus
 
 
 Origin of Rainbows: Colorism Exposed Documentary
 abcnews.go.com
 "Light, Bright, Damn near White" documentary film
 Shadeism Documentary